Sistan-e Olya (also Romanized as Sīstān-e ‘Olyā; also known as Sissun, Sīstān, Sīstān-e Bālā va Shīr Ḩabīb, and Sīsūn) is a village in Jolgah Rural District, in the Central District of Jahrom County, Fars Province, Iran. At the 2006 census, its population was 10, in 4 families.

References 

Populated places in Jahrom County